Samuel William Jarman (birth registered first ¼ 1887 – 15 August 1916) was an English professional rugby league footballer who played in the 1900s and 1910s.

Background
Billy Jarman's birth was registered in Leeds district, West Riding of Yorkshire, England, and he was killed aged 29 at the Battle of the Somme, France, his name is listed within the Thiepval Memorial.

Playing career

International honours
Selected to go on the 1914 Great Britain Lions tour of Australia and New Zealand while at Leeds, Jarman won caps for Great Britain against Australia (2 matches).

Upon returning from the 1914 tour of Australasia Jarman left to take part in World War I, and lost his life.

Only five players have played test matches for Great Britain as both a back, and a forward, they are; Colin Dixon, Frank Gallagher, Laurie Gilfedder, Billy Jarman, and Harry Street.

Challenge Cup Final appearances
Billy Jarman played as a forward, i.e. number 9, in Leeds' 7–7 draw with Hull F.C. in the 1909–10 Challenge Cup Final during the 1909–10 season at Fartown Ground, Huddersfield on Saturday 16 April 1910, in front of a crowd of 19,413, this was the first Challenge Cup Final to be drawn, and played as a forward, i.e. number 12, in the 26–12 victory over Hull F.C. in the 1909–10 Challenge Cup Final replay during the 1909–10 season at Fartown Ground, Huddersfield, on Monday 18 April 1910, in front of a crowd of 11,608, this was Leeds' first Challenge Cup Final win in their first appearance.

References

External links
!Great Britain Statistics at englandrl.co.uk (statistics currently missing due to not having appeared for both Great Britain, and England)
Statistics at rugbyleagueproject.org
True Heroes Remembered

1887 births
1916 deaths
British military personnel killed in the Battle of the Somme
English rugby league players
Great Britain national rugby league team players
Leeds Rhinos players
Rugby league players from Leeds
Rugby league fullbacks
Rugby league forwards
Military personnel from Leeds
British Army personnel of World War I
British Army soldiers
Rugby league utility players